The Bearpit, officially St James Barton roundabout, is a roundabout and urban space in Bristol, UK.

History 
The roundabout was constructed in the late 1960s and was reported to cost £900,000. It contained an inner garden with hexagonal flower beds.

In the 2010s, in response to safety concerns regarding the pedestrian subways, the roadway around the north and west of the roundabout was narrowed by one lane, and a new at-grade pedestrian and cycle route was created.

In June and July 2019, Bristol City Council carried out a £250,000 eviction and cleanup process where squatters and their possessions were removed from the space within the Bearpit.

Local area 
To the immediate west of the roundabout is Avon House, Bristol, now a hotel, and Bristol bus station.

References 

Roundabouts in England
Transport in Bristol